Kyle Justin might be:
The composer and set designer for the Internet comedy series Angry Video Game Nerd
Kyle DiFulvio, rock musician who has gone by the name Kyle Justin